Mesosa postfasciata is a species of beetle in the family Cerambycidae. It was described by Stephan von Breuning in 1974. It is known from Malaysia and Borneo.

References

postfasciata
Beetles described in 1974